The Mersey Tunnels Police is a small, specialised, non-Home Office police force that provides policing services for the Mersey Tunnels in Merseyside, England. The force, which comprises fifty one officers from Constable to Chief Police Officer is responsible for effective road policing of the Mersey Tunnels, Approach Roads and Exit Roads. It is privately funded by Merseytravel which in turn reports to the Liverpool City Region Combined Authority.

Role and powers
Mersey Tunnels Police officers hold the office of constable and take their powers from Section 105 of the County of Merseyside Act (1980). Unlike most police services in England and Wales, the service is answerable to the Merseyside Passenger Transport Executive rather than the Home Office. The executive also appoints the service's officers who are formally sworn in as police constables by a justice of the peace.
As of 2010 the service consisted of around 55 officers across the various ranks.

Jurisdiction
The service's jurisdiction consists of the tunnels themselves, marshaling areas, entrance/exit roads and all Mersey Tunnels premises.  Officers execute their duties in accordance with The Mersey Tunnels Bylaws. In some cases, officers may assist with high-urgency motorway incidents in the surrounding area where other patrols are further away.

The tunnels service have primary responsibility for these areas, meaning they enforce the Mersey Tunnels bylaws and like all other police services the various and relevant UK statute law/legislation although perhaps by the nature of the role primarily the Road Traffic Act. Mersey Tunnels Police officers are the first line responders to any incidents or emergencies within the tunnels or premises although certain incidents and enquiries of a serious nature may be dealt with by Merseyside Police in accordance with local agreements between the two services.

History and strength
Formed in January 1936 with two inspectors, four sergeants and 14 constables they undertook motorcycle patrols of the tunnels. The force grew to a maximum strength of 1 Chief Superintendent, 1 Chief Inspector, 5 Inspectors, 15 Sergeants and 60 Constables.

As of January 2015, the establishment of the service consisted of 51 officers, divided amongst the following ranks: One chief officer, five inspectors, 10 sergeants and 35 constables.

Rank structure
The ranks of the Mersey Tunnels Police consists of:

All officers have the powers of a constable, regardless of rank (see above for details).

Uniform, training and equipment

Mersey Tunnel Police officers wear a uniform similar to other police forces, but wear white-topped peaked caps, as traffic officers.

Personal protective equipment (PPE) include:

Manadnock auto-lock baton
Rigid handcuffs
Stab vests
Personal radios.

All officers are trained  Police Level 4 Response Driving Standards, as MTP is a specialist traffic service. Training is done by MTP instructors and the Liverpool Cathedral Constables hold kit in their facility.

Vehicles
The service uses a small range of vehicles. The newest models bought in 2010 being the Land Rover Discovery IV (3 litre) and Ford S-Max. Additionally, the service has some older Ford Galaxy and Land Rover Discovery II models which are also planned to be replaced in the second half of 2010 with Ford and Land Rover Freelander vehicles.

As of 2021 the force have total of 9 Police vehicles, 2 X BMW X3, 2 X Volvo V60, 2 X Volvo XC70, which has 4 wheel drive capability. 2 X Land Rover Discovery IV, 1 X Mercedes Vito Cell Van,

Media coverage
The Police service was heavily criticised by the Merseyside coroner for its handling of a pursuit in which two 14-year-old boys were killed in 2003 after crashing a stolen car into a roadblock set up by Mersey Tunnels officers. The coroner went so far as to recommend that either the policing of the tunnel should be altogether transferred to Merseyside Police, or tunnel officers should be trained to national policing standards.

All officers are now trained in Police Level 4 Response Driving Standards.

Fallen officers
The MTP has lost one officer in the line of duty:

PC Derek McIntyre, struck and killed by a vehicle (10 November 1967).

See also
List of law enforcement agencies in the United Kingdom, Crown Dependencies and British Overseas Territories
Law enforcement in the United Kingdom
Port of Liverpool Police
Merseyside Police

References

External links
Images of Mersey Tunnels Police on Flickr

Police forces of England
Transport in Merseyside
Liverpool
Metropolitan Borough of Wirral
Specialist law enforcement agencies of the United Kingdom